Lotta Linda Maria Nyman (born 21 January 1994), known as Linda Nyman, is a Finnish footballer who plays as a midfielder for Danish Elitedivisionen club AGF and the Finland women's national team. She previously played for FC Honka of the Naisten Liiga, Kungsbacka DFF of the Swedish Damallsvenskan and Inter Milan of the Italian Serie A.

Club career
In January 2020 Nyman completed a transfer from Kungsbacka DFF to Inter Milan. She joined a colony of five other Finnish players in the Italian Serie A. In April 2022 she joined Helsingin Jalkapalloklubi with a contract extending till the end of 2022 season.

International career
Nyman made her debut for the Finland women's national team on 2 March 2018, in a 4–0 defeat by Switzerland at the 2018 Cyprus Cup.

References

External links
 
 Linda Nyman profile at Football Association of Finland (SPL) 

1994 births
Living people
People from Kokkola
Finnish women's footballers
Women's association football midfielders
FC Honka (women) players
Kungsbacka DFF players
Inter Milan (women) players
EdF Logroño players
Kansallinen Liiga players
Damallsvenskan players
Serie A (women's football) players
Finnish expatriate footballers
Finland women's international footballers
Finnish expatriate sportspeople in Sweden
Expatriate women's footballers in Sweden
Finnish expatriate sportspeople in Italy
Expatriate women's footballers in Italy
Finnish expatriate sportspeople in Spain
Expatriate women's footballers in Spain
Sportspeople from Central Ostrobothnia